was a free-to-play multiplayer online game developed and published by Bandai Namco for the Wii U. The game was distributed via Nintendo eShop, and took advantage of the Nintendo Network. A public beta test was being held in Japan from 3 September until 13 September, followed by the title's commercial release on 2 December 2015. The game also released internationally on 28 April 2016. As of 30 May 2019, the game’s servers have been shut down.

Gameplay

At any given session, four players assume the roles of four characters - Sayuri, Dwayne, Victoria, and ShadowStalker - working cooperatively in missions to raid multi-roomed maps and recover treasure known as Relics. Players face against waves of various undead monsters, including giant bosses, in order to clear rooms, solve various puzzles, and move Relics to a certain point. Whilst recovering a Relic, one player taking the responsibility will be vulnerable, and has to depend on the team for protection. There is a play style system in defeating and defending from monsters called a "Multi-View Action System", including melee attacks, third-person shooting (trailing and over-the-shoulder), and first-person shooting. In the case one or more player falls, they can depend on their teammates for recovery, otherwise if all four players fall, then it is a mission failure. To clear any mission, the Relic must reach a certain point on the map. Or the players must defeat a boss.

The game also features events like most free-to-play games, such as getting higher EXP for finishing missions for the first 2 weeks.

Development
The game was announced on 14 January 2015, under its tentative title Project Treasure, via that month's Nintendo Direct presentation in all major regions. Producer Harada was featured in a segment opening up about a game they were working on exclusively for Wii U. The game is a free-to-play online, four-player co-operative action title which any Wii U owner with a Nintendo Network ID could download and join in, provided their console is always online. According to Harada, "four players could work together to complete varied stages" and "[the] basic aim is to clear traps, rout enemies, and seize treasure." Harada then concluded he was unable to disclose the game's official title or release date at that time, but he gave away the tentative title being "Project Treasure" and confirmed "[they are] working very hard on it." The segment closed hinting the game was coming soon.

Throughout the announcement segment, an array image featuring four different characters was teased, and no actual footage of the game was shown. On 31 May 2015, during the Japanese Nintendo Direct presentation, Nintendo released a gameplay trailer, featuring four unique characters fighting zombies in fast-paced melee combat within a labyrinth to find the treasure. The trailer concluded teasing that more information on the game would be revealed in the vague summer window of 2015. A day later, Nintendo of America released the English version of the same teaser trailer following their Nintendo Direct Micro.

On 28 August 2015, Bandai Namco Entertainment officially launched the game's Japanese website and released a new trailer, revealing the game's final title as Lost Reavers, as well as many other details. The game is powered by Unreal Engine. Japanese Wii U owners were able to participate in a public beta run between 3 and 13 September, after which the title was released commercially on 2 December 2015. An open beta of the English version of the game was released on 14 April 2016, and ran until 26 April 2016. The game officially released world-wide on 28 April 2016.

Reception 
Lost Reavers received "generally unfavorable reviews" from critics, garnering an aggregate score of 46/100 on review aggregator Metacritic.

References

External links
 

2015 video games
Action video games
Bandai Namco games
Cooperative video games
Free-to-play video games
Inactive multiplayer online games
Multiplayer online games
Multiplayer video games
Nintendo Network games
Products and services discontinued in 2019
Third-person shooters
Unreal Engine games
Video games developed in Japan
Video games featuring female protagonists
Wii U eShop games
Wii U-only games